Edward or Ed Gentry may refer to:

Ed Gentry, co-author of The Citadels; see List of Forgotten Realms novels
Ed Gentry, a character in the novel Deliverance

See also
Teddy Gentry, member of Alabama
Gentry (disambiguation)